Jack Marr (15 January 1928 – 14 April 2002) was an  Australian rules footballer who played with Hawthorn in the Victorian Football League (VFL).

Notes

External links 

1928 births
2002 deaths
Australian rules footballers from Victoria (Australia)
Hawthorn Football Club players